Vouvray-sur-Loir (literally Vouvray on Loir) is a former commune in the Sarthe department in the region of Pays de la Loire in north-western France. On 1 October 2016, it was merged into the new commune Montval-sur-Loir.

See also
Communes of the Sarthe department

References

Former communes of Sarthe
Maine (province)